Arsinoitherium is an extinct genus of paenungulate mammals belonging to the extinct order Embrithopoda. It is related to elephants, sirenians, hyraxes and the extinct desmostylians. Arsinoitheres were superficially rhinoceros-like herbivores that lived during the Late Eocene and the Early Oligocene of North Africa from 36 to 30 million years ago, in areas of tropical rainforest and at the margin of mangrove swamps. A species described in 2004, A. giganteum, lived in Ethiopia about 27 million years ago.

Taxonomy 
The best-known (and first-described) species is A. zitteli. Another species, A. giganteum, was discovered in the Ethiopian highlands of Chilga in 2003. The fossil teeth, far larger than those of A. zitteli, date to around 28–27 million years ago. While the Fayum Oasis is the only site where complete skeletons of Arsinoitherium fossils were recovered, arsinoitheriids have been found in southeastern Europe, including Crivadiatherium from Romania, and Hypsamasia and Palaeoamasia from Turkey.

The generic name Arsinoitherium comes from Pharaoh Arsinoe I (after whom the Faiyum Oasis, the region in which the first fossils were found, was called during the Ptolemaic Kingdom), and the  theríon "beast". The species epithet of the type species, A. zitteli, was given to it in honor of the eminent German paleontologist Karl Alfred Ritter von Zittel, regarded by some as the pioneer of paleontology in Egypt.

Description 

It measured 2.5 tons, only slightly smaller than the modern white rhino and due to the similar features and sizes, Arsinoitherium is commonly thought to be an extinct rhinoceros species, but it is not related to rhinos at all, instead, their closest relatives are elephants and manatees. They were massive, slow-moving animals with forelimbs adapted for pulling strongly backward rather than swinging forward, a feature typical of animals that punt themselves through shallow water or walk on soft, sticky ground. Fossils are found in sediments deposited in coastal swamps and warm, humid, heavily-vegetated lowland forests across what is now Africa and Arabia. The most noticeable features of Arsinoitherium were a pair of enormous horns above the nose and a second pair of tiny knob-like horns over the eyes. These were structurally similar to the horns of modern bovids. While reconstructions usually show them as similar to the ossicones of giraffes, in life each bony core may have been covered, like the horn cores of bovids, with a large horn of keratin. Both males and females had horns. While some investigators have described a larger and a smaller species from the same site, others have identified the difference in body and tooth size as sexual dimorphism. The skeleton is robust and the limbs were columnar, similar to those of elephants; the hips were also elephant-like, and arsinotheres were not built to run. Arsinoitherium had a full complement of 44 teeth, which is the primitive state of placental mammalian dentition. However, the genus had a unique and highly specialized way of chewing, shifting the jaw joint to produce constant pressure along its continuous row of teeth; it has been reconstructed as a highly selective browser.

Distribution 

Fossils of Arsinoitherium have been found in:
Eocene
 Aydim Formation, Oman
 Idam Unit Formation, Libya
 Djebel Chambi, Tunisia

Oligocene
 Malembe, Angola
 Jebel Qatrani Formation, Egypt
 Chilga formation, Ethiopia
 Erageleit Formation, Kenya
 Ashawq Formation, Oman
 Shumaysi Formation, Saudi Arabia

References

External links 

 New fossils from Ethiopia open a window on Africa's 'missing years'
 Arsinoitherium fact file on ''BBC Science & Nature: Prehistoric Life
Description of Arsinoitherium zitteli from upper Eocene strata in Egypt

Embrithopods
Prehistoric placental genera
Priabonian genus first appearances
Rupelian genus extinctions
Eocene mammals of Africa
Oligocene mammals of Africa
Fossils of Angola
Fossils of Egypt
Fossils of Ethiopia
Fossils of Kenya
Fossils of Libya
Fossils of Tunisia
Eocene mammals of Asia
Oligocene mammals of Asia
Fossils of Oman
Fossils of Saudi Arabia
Fossil taxa described in 1902